The fishing industry in Yemen has considerable potential but is vastly under-exploited. In 1998, the fishing sector employed some 41,000 people, mainly family-owned businesses operating small vessels. In 1998, 127,000 tons of fish were caught in Yemen. Proximity to the havens of the Somali pirates has had a discouraging effect.

Popular culture
Paul Torday wrote a comic novel, Salmon Fishing in the Yemen, published in 2007, about a westerner's commission to introduce salmon to the wadis of the Yemen highlands. The book was adapted into a film of the same name in 2011.

See also
Water supply and sanitation in Yemen

References

Yemen
Economy of Yemen
Water in Yemen
Yemen